South Ogan Komering Ulu Regency is a regency of South Sumatra Province, Indonesia. It covers an area of 5,493.94 km2, and had a population of 318,428 at the 2010 Census and 408,981 at the 2020 Census. The administrative centre is the town of Muaradua (not to be confused with Muara Dua District in Lhokseumawe City, Aceh Province). It borders Ogan Komering Ulu Regency,  East Ogan Komering Ulu Regency and Muara Enim Regency to the north. It also borders Lampung Province to the south and east and Bengkulu Province to the west.

Administrative districts 
The Regency is administratively composed of nineteen districts (kecamatan). Their areas (in km2) and their populations at the 2010 Census and 2020 Census are listed below:

References

Regencies of South Sumatra